Chester (formerly Big Meadows) is a census-designated place (CDP) in Plumas County, California, United States. The town is located along State Route 36. The US Postal Service ZIP code for the community is 96020. The population was 2,144 at the 2010 census, down from 2,316 at the 2000 census.

The primary industries in Chester are lumber production and tourism. Chester serves as the retail center for the Lake Almanor region of California, and derives a significant portion of its economy from the tourist trade, and to a lesser degree from construction to new residents and businesses.

History
The town was founded and named by two settlers, one from Chester, Vermont, and another from Chester, Missouri. The Chester post office opened in 1894 and moved in 1908.

Geography
Chester is located at  (40.302395, -121.234672).

Chester is situated almost directly over the buried north end of the fault-block Sierra Nevada and the southernmost end of the volcanic Cascade Range.

Climate
According to the Köppen climate classification, Chester has a transitional Csb/Dsb climate. Winters are cold and very snowy. Summers are dry, with hot days and cold nights.

Demographics

2010
At the 2010 census Chester had a population of 2,144. The racial makeup of Chester was 1,954 (91.1%) White, 10 (0.5%) African American, 46 (2.1%) Native American, 21 (1.0%) Asian, 4 (0.2%) Pacific Islander, 37 (1.7%) from other races, and 72 (3.4%) from two or more races. Hispanic or Latino of any race were 178 people (8.3%).

The census reported that 2,131 people (99.4% of the population) lived in households, 1 (0%) lived in non-institutionalized group quarters, and 12 (0.6%) were institutionalized.

There were 943 households, 249 (26.4%) had children under the age of 18 living in them, 454 (48.1%) were opposite-sex married couples living together, 81 (8.6%) had a female householder with no husband present, 46 (4.9%) had a male householder with no wife present.  There were 73 (7.7%) unmarried opposite-sex partnerships, and 3 (0.3%) same-sex married couples or partnerships. 288 households (30.5%) were one person and 95 (10.1%) had someone living alone who was 65 or older. The average household size was 2.26.  There were 581 families (61.6% of households); the average family size was 2.81.

The age distribution was 465 people (21.7%) under the age of 18, 154 people (7.2%) aged 18 to 24, 456 people (21.3%) aged 25 to 44, 758 people (35.4%) aged 45 to 64, and 311 people (14.5%) who were 65 or older.  The median age was 44.9 years. For every 100 females, there were 101.7 males.  For every 100 females age 18 and over, there were 98.7 males.

There were 1,237 housing units at an average density of 167.9 per square mile, of the occupied units 568 (60.2%) were owner-occupied and 375 (39.8%) were rented. The homeowner vacancy rate was 3.5%; the rental vacancy rate was 15.7%.  1,317 people (61.4% of the population) lived in owner-occupied housing units and 814 people (38.0%) lived in rental housing units.

2000
As of the 2000 census, there were 2,316 people in 956 households, including 647 families, in the CDP. The racial makeup of the CDP was 92.62% White, 0.22% Black or African American, 2.12% Native American, 0.47% Asian, 0.13% Pacific Islander, 1.55% from other races, and 2.89% from two or more races. 6.04% of the population were Hispanic or Latino of any race.

Of the 956 households 32.4% had children under the age of 18 living with them, 54.1% were married couples living together, 9.5% had a female householder with no husband present, and 32.3% were non-families. 28.1% of households were one person and 11.2% were one person aged 65 or older. The average household size was 2.38 and the average family size was 2.90.

The age distribution was 27.1% under the age of 18, 4.6% from 18 to 24, 25.0% from 25 to 44, 27.6% from 45 to 64, and 15.6% 65 or older. The median age was 41 years. For every 100 females, there were 98.3 males. For every 100 females age 18 and over, there were 94.2 males.

The median household income was $33,413 and the median family income  was $45,195. Males had a median income of $33,417 versus $26,164 for females. The per capita income for the CDP was $17,569. About 9.6% of families and 12.4% of the population were below the poverty line, including 11.7% of those under age 18 and 6.5% of those age 65 or over.

Activities and features

Chester is near several areas of interest for outdoor activities, within a 50-mile radius the town has numerous CDF and USFS trails and campgrounds, Lassen Volcanic National Park, Drakesbad and Lake Almanor are other areas of interest for vacationers and tourists with outdoor hobbies. The Boy Scouts of America's Nevada Area Council also operates Camp Fleischmann in the region.

Lake Almanor is a popular hunting, fishing and boating destination. The lake is home for a variety of fish and bird species, many of which make for good sport and game. Chester and the greater Lake Almanor area are home to many seasonal and year-round resorts and restaurants that cater to the locals and the summer seasonal tourists. The winter tourism tends to be quieter, the town is often a way point for people traveling to ski resorts at Mount Shasta and Lake Tahoe.

Economy
The primary industries in Chester are lumber production and tourism. Collins Pine (a division of The Collins Companies) has been in operation since the 1940s under a "sustained yield" management plan using selective harvesting. The company's forest management practices have been certified as FSC sustainable by Scientific Certification Systems, which designated it a "state-of-the-art well-managed forest."  Collins no longer maintains the distinction of Chester's dominant employer, though it remains the single business with the most employees. 

Other logging companies operating in the area are Roseburg Forest Products, and Sierra Pacific Industries.  Clear cutting is performed in the area.

Lake Almanor has developed as a vacation/tourist destination and Chester serves as the retail center for the area. All of the Almanor basin's four gas stations are located in Chester, as well as the Almanor basin's only full-sized grocery store.

Politics

School District, Chester Elementary School, Chester Junior Senior High School, and Almanor High School (continuation) are part of the Plumas Unified School District based in Quincy, California. The Chester Learning Center is a private charter school. It is accredited K-12 by the WASC, Western Association of Schools and Colleges and managed by the Plumas Charter School system.

Notable people 
 Chuck Norris (born 1940), American actor whose wife Gena Norris is Chester–born, they have a vacation home in Chester.
 Tony Miller (born 1948), former California Secretary of State
 Marie Mason Potts (1895–1978), Mountain Maidu Native American journalist and activist; born in Big Meadows

References

Company towns in California
Census-designated places in Plumas County, California
Populated places established in 1894
Census-designated places in California